The 2021 Big South Conference women's soccer tournament was the postseason women's soccer tournament for the Big South Conference held from October 31 through November 7, 2021. The tournament was hosted by the higher seed in the Quarterfinals and the higher remaining seed in the Semifinals and Finals. The eight-team single-elimination tournament consisted of three rounds based on seeding from regular season conference play. Campbell were the defending champions, and the first overall seed in the tournament.  However, they were unable to defend their crown, falling in extra time to High Point in the final.  The conference tournament title was the seventh for the High Point women's soccer program and the first for head coach Brandi Fontaine.  As tournament champions, High Point earned the Big South's automatic berth into the 2021 NCAA Division I Women's Soccer Tournament.

Seeding 
The top six teams in the regular season earned a spot in the tournament.  Three teams tied for fifth place with 5–5 records and fifteen points at the end of the regular season.  Therefore, only two teams of Charleston Southern, Gardner–Webb, and UNC Asheville could qualify for the tournament.  The tiebreaker was decided based on regular season records between the schools.  Charleston Southern won the tiebreaker by virtue of defeating Gardner–Webb and UNC Asheville during the regular season and was therefore the fifth seed.  Gardner–Webb defeated UNC Asheville during the regular season and lost to Charleston Southern and therefore was the sixth seed.  UNC Asheville lost to both Charleston Southern and Gardner–Webb during the regular season and therefore did not qualify for the tournament.

Bracket

Source:

Schedule

Quarterfinals

Semifinals

Final

Statistics

Goalscorers

All-Tournament team

Source:

MVP in bold

See also 
 Big South Conference
 2021 NCAA Division I women's soccer season
 2021 NCAA Division I Women's Soccer Tournament

References 

2021 Big South Conference women's soccer season
Big South Conference Women's Soccer Tournament